"The Lady Astronaut of Mars" is an alternate history/science fiction short story by Mary Robinette Kowal. It was first published in 2012 as part of the Audible.com anthology Rip-Off.

Synopsis
Thirty years after Elma York led the first expedition to Mars, she must choose between going on one last space mission or staying with her elderly husband as he dies.

Reception
"The Lady Astronaut of Mars" was nominated for the 2013 Hugo Award for Best Novelette, but was disqualified on the grounds that, since it was originally presented in audio format, and Kowal had included stage directions for the benefit of readers, it should instead be in the category for Best Dramatic Presentation, Short Form — where it did not have enough nominations to remain on the final ballot. A text version was subsequently published on Kowal's own site and on Tor.com; it won the 2014 Hugo Award for Best Novelette.

The Los Angeles Review of Books considered it "shaky", attributing its Hugo win both to voter sympathy for Kowal's having been disqualified the previous year, and for its use of "the twin voter vices of nostalgia and sentimentality".

Prequels

Kowal has released three novel-length prequels — The Calculating Stars and The Fated Sky in 2018, and The Relentless Moon in 2020 — depicting the disasters which led Elma's timeline to go to Mars in the 1960s and the struggles of establishing a colony there.  She has also written a number of other short stories in this universe.

References

External links
Text of the story at Tor.com

Hugo Award for Best Novelette winning works
Alternate history short stories